Earl Ross (September 4, 1941 – September 18, 2014) was a Canadian race car driver who competed in the NASCAR Winston Cup Series from 1973 to 1976 driving the Carling Red Cap #52.

Career summary
Ross was born in Fortune, Prince Edward Island, Canada, and was known for being one of only five non-American born drivers to have won a NASCAR Cup Series race (the others being Juan Pablo Montoya, who won the 2007 Toyota/Save Mart 350, Mario Andretti, who won the 1967 Daytona 500, Marcos Ambrose who won the 2011 Heluva Good! Sour Cream Dips at The Glen, and Daniel Suárez, who won the 2022 Toyota/Save Mart 350). Ross's only NASCAR win came at Martinsville Speedway on September 29, 1974, during the Old Dominion 500. After qualifying 11th, Ross beat Buddy Baker to the line by more than a lap, thus making him the first and still the only Canadian to have ever won a Winston Cup event. Ron Fellows however has wins in the Nationwide Series and the Camping World Truck Series. Stewart Friesen and Raphaël Lessard have also won in the Truck Series. At that time, Earl was the first rookie to win a Grand National race since Richard Petty accomplished the feat several years earlier.

The victory helped Ross win the Winston Cup Rookie of the Year in 1974. After competing in only 2 events in '75 and '76, Ross retired from NASCAR racing. He recorded one win, five top-5s and 10 top 10s in 26 races.

Ross competed in a number of regional racing series throughout the 1960s, 1970s, 1980s and 1990s, including time on the ASA circuit and CASCAR Super Series. He also participated in regular Friday night racing at Delaware Speedway before his ultimate retirement in the late 1990s.

Ross was inducted into the Canadian Motorsport Hall of Fame in 2000, FOAR SCORE (Friends Of Auto Racing Seeking Cooperation Of Racing Enthusiasts) Hall of Fame in 2002 and the Maritime Motorsports Hall of Fame in 2011.

Ross, a resident of Ailsa Craig, Ontario, died on September 18, 2014, at the age of 73.

Motorsports career results

NASCAR
(key) (Bold – Pole position awarded by qualifying time. Italics – Pole position earned by points standings or practice time. * – Most laps led.)

Winston Cup Series

Daytona 500

See also
List of Canadians in NASCAR

References

External links 

1941 births
2014 deaths
People from Kings County, Prince Edward Island
Racing drivers from Prince Edward Island
NASCAR drivers
People from Middlesex County, Ontario
American Speed Association drivers